Mount Rowe, elevation , is a mountain located north of Gunstock Mountain in the Belknap Range, Belknap County, New Hampshire, United States. It has been home to multiple alpine ski operations, including the original Gunstock Mountain Resort single chairlift (now removed), the Belknap Ski Jumps, and the defunct Alpine Ridge/Mt. Rowe ski area.

External links 

  Mt. Rowe - FranklinSites.com Hiking Guide
 Mount Rowe/Alpine Ridge, New England Lost Ski Areas Project
 "Mt. Rowe", Belknap Range Trails site

Rowe
Rowe
Defunct ski areas and resorts in New Hampshire